The Chico River is a river of Chubut Province, Argentina. It is a tributary of the Chubut River, joining it at the Florentino Ameghino Dam.

Before 1939 water from the Senguerr River entered the Chico via an outlet on the east side of Lake Colhue Huapi, but heavy use of water for irrigation has lowered the lake level and led to desiccation of the Chico river. The wide valley of the Chico is mostly dry today, except during periods of especially heavy snowmelt in the Andean headwaters of the Senguerr.

See also
List of rivers of Argentina

References
 Rand McNally, The New International Atlas, 1993.
  GEOnet Names Server 
 Hydrogeology of a Large Oil-and-Gas Basin in Central Patagonia

Rivers of Argentina